Homebush is a rural area in the Masterton District and Wellington Region of New Zealand's North Island. It is about 3 km southeast of Masterton.

The historic house at 10 Homebush Road was designed by Charles Natusch in 1891 for William Lucena. Lucena died very soon after the house was complete.

Demographics 

Homebush-Te Ore Ore had a population of 1,050 at the 2018 New Zealand census, an increase of 108 people (11.5%) since the 2013 census, and an increase of 90 people (9.4%) since the 2006 census. There were 387 households. There were 495 males and 555 females, giving a sex ratio of 0.89 males per female. The median age was 49 years (compared with 37.4 years nationally), with 183 people (17.4%) aged under 15 years, 141 (13.4%) aged 15 to 29, 483 (46.0%) aged 30 to 64, and 243 (23.1%) aged 65 or older.

Ethnicities were 92.0% European/Pākehā, 15.1% Māori, 0.6% Pacific peoples, 1.4% Asian, and 2.0% other ethnicities (totals add to more than 100% since people could identify with multiple ethnicities).

The proportion of people born overseas was 13.7%, compared with 27.1% nationally.

Although some people objected to giving their religion, 48.3% had no religion, 40.9% were Christian, 0.3% were Buddhist and 2.9% had other religions.

Of those at least 15 years old, 174 (20.1%) people had a bachelor or higher degree, and 144 (16.6%) people had no formal qualifications. The median income was $36,500, compared with $31,800 nationally. The employment status of those at least 15 was that 453 (52.2%) people were employed full-time, 180 (20.8%) were part-time, and 21 (2.4%) were unemployed.

References

Masterton District
Populated places in the Wellington Region